Lord's Middle Ground was a cricket venue in London that was established by Thomas Lord in 1811.  It was used mainly by Marylebone Cricket Club for major matches until 1813, after which Lord was obliged to relocate because the land was requisitioned for the cutting of the Regent's Canal.

Matches
The first match known to have been played at Lord's Middle Ground was B Aislabie's XI v G Osbaldeston's XI in July 1811.  Only three first-class matches were ever recorded at the ground, one in each season between 1811 and 1813 at the height of the Napoleonic Wars.

James Rice played all three matches of his first-class career at the Middle Ground and, equally, all the matches ever played at the Middle Ground featured James Rice.

Location
Lord's Middle Ground was at North Bank at the north end of Lisson Grove, just south of the modern ground.  In 1814, Lord opened the present Lord's Cricket Ground, formerly a duckpond in St John's Wood.

References

External links
 Lord's
 CricInfo's page on Lord's Middle Ground

 

1811 establishments in England
Cricket grounds in Middlesex
Defunct cricket grounds in England
Defunct sports venues in London
English cricket in the 19th century
History of Middlesex
Sports venues completed in 1811
Marylebone Cricket Club